Narayan Bhikaji Parulekar commonly referred as Nanasaheb Parulekar (20 September 1897 – 8 January 1973), was the Founding Editor of Sakal, a Marathi daily newspaper, launched in January 1932. He also remained the Chairman of the Press Trust of India.

Today, Sakal is the flagship daily of Pune-based Sakal Media Group, which also runs newspapers including Sakaal Times and Gomantak, and sells almost 300,000 copies in Pune district and over 1,000,000 copies across Maharashtra.

Parulekar was a recipient of the civilian honour of the Padma Bhushan.

Personal life
He was married to a Frenchwoman Shanta Genevieve Pommeret and had daughter Claude Lila Parulekar, a noted animal rights activist.

References

1897 births
1973 deaths
Indian male journalists
Indian newspaper editors
Marathi people
Journalists from Maharashtra
Recipients of the Padma Bhushan in literature & education
20th-century Indian journalists